The 9th Army was an army level command of the German Army in World War I.  It was formed in September 1914 in Breslau to command troops on the southern sector of the Eastern Front.  The army was dissolved on 30 July 1916, but reformed in Transylvania on 6 September 1916 for the Romanian Campaign.  It was transferred to the Western Front on 19 June 1918 where it was finally dissolved on 18 September 1918.

History

First formation 

The 9th Army Headquarters was established in Breslau on 19 September 1914 and commanded units drawn from the 8th Army, the Western Front and other units in Upper Silesia.  It was originally placed on the southern sector of the Eastern Front on the left flank of the 1st Austro-Hungarian Army.

Second formation 
9th Army was reformed for the Romanian Campaign in September 1916.  Along with the 1st Austro-Hungarian Army (1st A-H Army) it formed the Siebenburg Sector and had the following units:
XXXIX Reserve Corps
Group von Szivo (A-H)
Group Danube (A-H)
145th Infantry Brigade (A-H)
Group Sunkel (A-H)
187th Division
part of 144th Infantry Brigade (A-H)
part of Alpenkorps
Group Krafft
part of Alpenkorps
Cavalry Corps "Schmettow"
51st Honvéd Infantry Division (A-H)
3rd Cavalry Division
1st Cavalry Division (A-H)
En route
76th Reserve Division

Commanders 
The original 9th Army had the following commanders until it was dissolved 30 July 1916:

A "new" 9th Army was formed in Transylvania for the Romanian Campaign on 6 September 1916.  It was dissolved on the Western Front on 18 September 1918.

Glossary 
Armee-Abteilung or Army Detachment in the sense of "something detached from an Army".  It is not under the command of an Army so is in itself a small Army.
Armee-Gruppe or Army Group in the sense of a group within an Army and under its command, generally formed as a temporary measure for a specific task.
Heeresgruppe or Army Group in the sense of a number of armies under a single commander.

See also 

9th Army (Wehrmacht) for the equivalent formation in World War II
Great Retreat (Russian)

References

Bibliography 
 
 

09
Military units and formations established in 1914
Military units and formations disestablished in 1916
Military units and formations established in 1916
Military units and formations disestablished in 1918